Ivan Vladimirov Nikolov (1928 – January 2014) was a Bulgarian basketball player. He competed in the men's tournament at the 1952 Summer Olympics.

References

External links

1928 births
2014 deaths
Bulgarian men's basketball players
Olympic basketball players of Bulgaria
Basketball players at the 1952 Summer Olympics
Place of birth missing
Date of birth missing
Place of death missing